"Ghost Town" (stylised in all capitals) is the debut single by American singer and songwriter Benson Boone, released on October 15, 2021, through Night Street Records. It was co-written by Boone with JT Daly, Nolan Sipe and Tushar Apte, and produced by Daly. It reached number one in Norway, the top 10 in Denmark and top 20 in Sweden.

Background
Benson Boone has been called a "TikTok star", having over 2 million followers on the app. He appeared on season 19 of American Idol in early 2021, where he won a golden ticket to Hollywood, but left because he felt the show was "not right" for him. Following this, he signed with Dan Reynolds' Warner Records label Night Street Records and released "Ghost Town".

Critical reception
Joe Lynch of Billboard called the song an "elegant, lonely piano ballad that shows off [Boone's] robust yet restrained vocals and knack for melodic detail".

Charts

Weekly charts

Year-end charts

Certifications

Release history

References

2021 debut singles
2021 songs
Number-one singles in Norway
Songs written by Nolan Sipe
Songs written by Tushar Apte